Statistics of Campeonato da 1ª Divisão do Futebol in the 1989 season.

Overview
Hap Kuan won the championship.

References
RSSSF

Macau
Macau
Campeonato da 1ª Divisão do Futebol seasons
football